Tamás György (born 7 September 1971) is a Hungarian former professional tennis player.

György competed as high up as ATP Challenger level and won a doubles tournament in Budapest in 1994, partnering Emanuel Couto. He had a career best singles ranking of 664 in the world and featured in the qualifying draw for the 1997 Australian Open. His elder brother, Károly, was a professional tennis player active in the 1990s.

ATP Challenger titles

Doubles: (1)

References

External links
 
 

1971 births
Living people
Hungarian male tennis players
20th-century Hungarian people
21st-century Hungarian people